Barbu may refer to:

People
 Barbu (name), a list of people with the name and surname Barbu
 Alejandro Barbudo Lorenzo, nicknamed Barbu, Spanish footballer

Places
 Barbu, Iran, a village in the Bushehr Province of Iran
 Barbu, Norway, a former municipality in Aust-Agder county, Norway
 Barbu Church, a church in the city of Arendal in Norway

Other
 Barbu (card game), a card game originating in France
 Barbu (Polydactylus virginicus), a species of threadfin fish from the West Atlantic